AACM may refer to:

 Ali Akbar College of Music, three schools founded by Indian musician Ali Akbar Khan to teach Indian classical music
 Ardennes American Cemetery and Memorial, a cemetery for American World War II dead on foreign soil
 Association for the Advancement of Creative Musicians, a non-profit organization of musicians
 Civil Aviation Authority of Macau (Autoridade de Aviação Civil da Região Administrativa Especial de Macau)